The Limelight Awards were an annual celebration of the performances, recordings and music personalities in Australian classical music. Sponsored by the monthly classical arts magazine Limelight, they were the only publicly voted awards of their kind in Australia. In 2012 the awards attracted more than 4,500 votes.

The Limelight Award winners are voted on from a shortlist of entries selected by an expert panel of Limelight critics and ABC Classic FM staff over ten categories. These categories included Music Personality of the Year, Best Newcomer and Best Orchestral, Chamber and Solo performances. From this shortlist the public were then invited to select and vote for their favourite musicians. The Limelight Awards were distinctly unique, being the only classical music awards in Australia where the public are invited to help recognise well-loved musicians.

Award winners

2012

Music Personality of the Year: Simone Young, conductor
Best Orchestral Concert: Australian Chamber Orchestra, Beethoven: Symphony No 9; Calm Sea and Prosperous Voyage; Brahms: Geistliches Lied; Messiaen: Prayer of Christ ascending towards his Father
Best Chamber Music Concert: Australian String Quartet/Brett Dean, Legacy
Best Solo Performance: Anne-Sophie Mutter, Beethoven Violin Concerto
Best Opera Production: La traviata, Opera Australia
Best Performance in an Opera: Emma Matthews, Violetta in La traviata
Best Classical Recording: Sydney Symphony Orchestra / Vladimir Ashkenazy, SSO Live 201201
Best New Composition: Elena Kats-Chernin, Symphonia Eluvium
Best Event/Festival: Australian Festival of Chamber Music
Best Newcomer: Emily Sun, violinist

2011

Music Personality of the year: Vladimir Ashkenazy
Best Orchestral Concert: Simone Young
Best Opera Production: Der Rosenkavalier, Opera Australia
Best Chamber Music Concert: Synergy Percussion, Xenakis Pleiades
Best Performance in an Opera: Teddy Tahu Rhodes, Figaro in The Marriage of Figaro
Best Solo Performance: Fiona Campbell
Best World Music Recording: Band of Brothers
Best Classical Recording: Mozart Violin Concertos Vol. 2, ACO/Richard Tognetti (BIS)
Best Jazz Recording: Idea of North, Extraordinary Tale (ABC Classics)
Best Event/Festival: Musica Viva Festival
Best New Composition: Nigel Westlake, Missa Solis: Requiem for Eli
Best Newcomer: Zane Banks

2010

Limelight Readers’ Choice: Emma Matthews (soprano)
Music Personality of the year: Richard Tognetti
Best Orchestral Concert: Australian Chamber Orchestra/Richard Tognetti, Schumann cello concerto; Beethoven symphony no 5; Vasks: Vox Amoris; Mozart: Symphony No 41 Jupiter
Best Opera Production: Bliss (Opera Australia)
Best Chamber Music Concert: Australian Chamber Orchestra and Patricia Kopatchinskaja, The Barefoot Fiddler.
Best Performance in an Opera: Teddy Tahu Rhodes, Figaro in The Marriage of Figaro
Best Solo Performance: Paul Lewis (Piano) Musica Viva
Best World Music Recording: Band of Brothers
Best Classical Recording: Handel: Concerti Grossi Op. 6, Australian Brandenburg Orchestra/Paul Dyer (ABC Classics)
Best Jazz Recording: James Oehlers and Paul Grabowsky, On a Clear Day (Head Records)
Best Event/Festival: Musica Viva Festival
Best New Composition: Bliss. Brett Dean
Best Newcomer: Zubin Kanga (Piano)

2009

Limelight Readers' Choice: Richard Tognetti
Music Personality of the year: Geoffrey Gurrumul Yunupingu
Best Orchestral Concert: Sydney Symphony Orchestra/Vladimir Ashkenazy, Elgar: The Dream of Gerontius
Best Opera Production: Bliss (Opera Australia)
Best Chamber Music Concert: Australian Chamber Orchestra, Schoenberg: Transfigured Night
Best Performance in an Opera: Teddy Tahu Rhodes, Figaro in The Marriage of Figaro
Best Solo Performance: James Ehnes with Sydney Symphony Orchestra
Best World Music Achievement: Dan Sultan, Womadelaide
Best Classical Recording: Goldner String Quartet, Beethoven the complete string quartets
Best Jazz Recording: Tom O’Halloran Trio, We Happy Few
Best Event/Festival: Australian Festival of Chamber Music
Best New Composition: Carl Vine Symphony No. 7
Best Newcomer: Hamer String Quartet

2008

Music Personality of the year: Richard Tognetti
Best Classical Crossover Artist: Il Divo
Best Orchestral Concert: Sydney Symphony/David Robertson, Stravinsky: The Firebird
Best Chamber music concert: Australian Brandenburg Orchestra with Andreas Scholl. 
Best Solo performance: Nigel Kennedy violin concertos by Mozart & Beethoven
Best World music achievement: Geoffrey Gurrumul Yunupingu
Best Classical recording: Slava Grigoryan & Leonard Grigoryan, Baroque Guitar Concertos (ABC Classics) 
Best Jazz achievement: Don Burrows
Best Event/festival: Sydney International Piano Competition of Australia
Best Newcomer: Geoffrey Gurrumul Yunupingu

2007

Music Personality of the year: Jonathan Welch (Choirmaster, Choir of Hard Knocks)
Best Classical Crossover Artist: Il Divo
Best Orchestral Concert: Piers Lane (piano) with the Queensland Orchestra/Pietari Inkinen, Beethoven Piano Concerto No. 5 ‘Emperor’
Best Chamber music concert: Australian Chamber Orchestra/Patricia Kopatchinskaja: Hope  
Best Solo performance: Hakan Hardenberger, Trumpet
Best World music achievement: Geoffrey Gurrumul Yunupingu
Best Classical recording: Sara Macliver/Tasmanian Symphony Orchestra/Sebastian Lang-Lessing, Mozart: Arias (ABC Classics) 
Best World Music Achievement: Joseph Tawadros & James Tawadros, Ben Rogers, Epiphany
Best Jazz achievement: Phil Slater Quartet; The Thousands
Best New Composition: Kaidan by Ian Cleworth, Timothy Constable Riley Lee and members of TaikOz
Best Event/festival: Adelaide Symphony Orchestra, Sibelius Festival
Best Newcomer: Benjamin Northey (conductor)

References 

Classical music awards
Australian music awards